Zodiac was a space disco music band that existed in the 1980s in Latvia, then a part of Soviet Union. The band was extremely popular in the Soviet Union and has been credited by critics as the Soviet answer to the French band Space who were popular at the time.

Biography

Zodiac was formed by Jānis Lūsēns, then studying composition at the Latvian State Conservatory in Riga (now Jāzeps Vītols Latvian Academy of Music). The other four members of the group were also students of various faculties of the same conservatory.

Zodiac's first vinyl record Disco Alliance was released in 1980 on the monopolist Melodiya label, during the band members' studentship. The album was produced by Aleksandrs Grīva, the father of band member Zane Grīva. The music featured a lot of then-unusual synthesized sounds and effects together with more conventional euro disco elements.

The second album Music in the Universe released two years later was much inspired by a meeting with cosmonauts in the Star City, Moscow and their tales about space flights. The music of the second album was much more rock-influenced than the first.

During that time the band also performed the music of Viktor Vlasov for the films Женские радости и печали (Woman's Joys and Sorrows, 1982) and Экипаж машины боевой (The Tank Crew, 1983), the soundtracks for both films were released on a vinyl record Music from the Films in 1985. The music of the group was also used in the documentary film about the cosmonaut artist Alexei Leonov Звёздная палитра (Star Palette, 1982).

The album In memoriam was composed and produced by Jānis Lūsēns alone and released in 1989. The album was dedicated to the ancient and modern cultural and natural heritage of Latvia. The sounding of the album turned from disco to light techno/synthpop while gaining a lot of classical music influences as well as the influence of Jean Michel Jarre's ambient works.

The last album Clouds was released in 1991 by RiTonis (former Melodiya). It contains a hit song of the early 1990s in Latvia "My favourite flowers".

Disco Alliance and Music in the Universe were released together on compact disc by Mikrofona Ieraksti (which represents EMI in the Baltic states).

In the early 2000s, the Russian electronic duo PPK recorded a remix of Zodiac's composition "Zodiac" from the Disco Alliance album. This remix, titled "Reload", entered the charts in a number of territories.

Discography 
All the albums are equally known under their Russian and English titles and had both spellings on their original covers.

 Disco Alliance (1980)
 Zodiac
 Pacific
 Provincial Disco
 Polo
 Mirage
 Rock on the Ice
 Alliance

 Music in the Universe (1982)
 The Mysterious Galaxy
 Laser Illumination
 Silver Dream
 Photo Finish
 The Other Side of Heaven
 In the Light of Saturn
 Flight Over El Dorado

 Music from the films (Музыка из kинофильмов, Muzyka iz kinofilmov) (1985) (Russian only)

 In memoriam (1989) (Russian only)
 In Memoriam / V Kurzeme (In Courland)
 Ostrov Moritsala (Moricsala Island)
 V Muzeye Pod Otkrytym Nebom (In the Open Air Museum)
 Rundalskiy Dvorets (Rundāle Palace)
 Doma Staroy Rigi (Houses of Old Riga)
 Pastorale (bergerette)
 Na Gore Zilayskalns (On the Mount Zilaiskalns)

 Mākoņi (Clouds) (1991) (Latvian only)
 Pakrēšļa puķes (Twilight Flowers)
 Staburags un saules meitiņa (Staburags and the Daughter of the Sun)
 Veltījums (Dedication)
 Daugava (Daugava River)
 Manas mīļākās puķes(My Favourite Flowers)
 Mākoņi (Clouds)
 Es tevis meklēju (Searching for You)
 Rotaļa (A Game)
 Bohēmieša dziesma (Bohemian's Song)

Line-up
Since the group rarely performed live every new album had a new line-up except the producer Jānis Lūsēns.

Disco Alliance:
 Jānis Lūsēns – ARP Omni, ARP Odyssey, celesta, production
 Zane Grīva – piano, ARP Omni, vocals
 Andris Sīlis – guitar
 Ainārs Ašmanis – bass guitar
 Andris Reinis – drums
 Aleksander Grīva – production

Music in the Universe:
 Jānis Lūsēns – piano, Yamaha SK-50D, production
 Aivars Gudrais – guitar on tracks 2–4, 6
 Dzintars Sāgens – guitar on tracks 1, 5, 7
 Ivars Piļka – bass guitar
 Andris Reinis – drums
 Aleksander Grīva – production

The line-up on Music from the Films is unknown, the original CD cover has only the following info:

 Viktor Vlasov – composition
 Aleksander Grīva – producing, sound engineering

In memoriam:
 Jānis Lūsēns – synthesizers, piano, production
 Zigfrīds Muktupāvels – vocals, DDD-1, violin
 Dzintars Sāgens – computer, guitar
 Guntis Zvirgzdiņš – synthesizer
 Maija Lūsēna – vocals on track 4
 Normunds Šnē – oboe on track 3
 Aivars Gudrais – guitar on track 5
 Ivars Piļka – sound engineering

Clouds:
 Jānis Lūsēns – synthesizers, piano, production
 Maija Lūsēna – vocals
 Zigfrīds Muktupāvels – vocals, programming, violin
 Aivars Gudrais – guitar
 Gatis Gaujenieks – sound engineering
 Ivars Piļka – sound engineering
 P. Joksts – cover design

References

Latvian electronic music groups
Eurodisco groups
Latvian rock music groups
Soviet rock music groups